Marijan Novović (February 10, 1947 – September 5, 2013), also known by his nickname Šilja, was a Serbian basketball coach and player.

Playing career 
In his playing days, he spent his career with OKK Beograd of the Yugoslav League, before finishing his playing career with Belgian side Strombeek Beavers.

Coaching career 
Novović started his coaching career as an assistant coach for Racing Club de France (France). Later, he coached Sloboda Tuzla, Maribor, Radnički Belgrade and OKK Beograd of the Yugoslav First Federal League. He also spent two seasons in Italy where he coached and Pallacanestro Battipaglia from Salerno.

He also coached the senior national teams of Gabon and Tunisia and the U22 national team of North Korea.

References

1947 births
2013 deaths
Basketball players from Belgrade
KK Proleter Zrenjanin coaches
KK Kolubara coaches
OKK Beograd coaches
OKK Beograd players
ŽKK Crvena zvezda coaches
KK Sloboda Tuzla coaches
BKK Radnički coaches
Serbian expatriate basketball people in Belgium
Serbian expatriate basketball people in Bosnia and Herzegovina
Serbian expatriate basketball people in Gabon
Serbian expatriate basketball people in France
Serbian expatriate basketball people in Italy
Serbian expatriate basketball people in North Korea
Serbian expatriate basketball people in Slovenia
Serbian expatriate basketball people in Tunisia
Serbian men's basketball coaches
Serbian men's basketball players
University of Belgrade Faculty of Sport and Physical Education alumni